The 2004 Tecate/Telmex Grand Prix of Monterrey was the second round of the 2004 Bridgestone Presents the Champ Car World Series Powered by Ford season, held on May 23, 2004 on the streets of Fundidora Park in Monterrey, Mexico.  Sébastien Bourdais swept pole position and the race win, his first pole and win of the season.

Qualifying results

Race

Caution flags

Notes

 New Track Record Sébastien Bourdais 1:13.915 (Qualification Session #2)
 New Race Lap Record Sébastien Bourdais 1:15.021
 New Race Record Sébastien Bourdais 1:45:01.498
 Average Speed 86.544 mph

Championship standings after the race

Drivers' Championship standings

 Note: Only the top five positions are included.

External links
 Full Weekend Times & Results
 Friday Group 1 Qualifying Results
 Friday Group 2 Qualifying Results
 Saturday Qualifying Results
 Race Box Score

Monterrey
Grand Prix of Monterrey
21st century in Monterrey
2004 in Mexican motorsport